Alastair J. S. Summerlee was the Interim President and Vice-Chancellor of Carleton University located in Ottawa, Ontario, Canada.  He was previously the seventh president of the University of Guelph.

President Summerlee, whose career as a scholar, professor, researcher, and administrator spans nearly 30 years, joined the University of Guelph faculty in 1988 as a professor in the Department of Biomedical Sciences.  He was named an associate dean of the Ontario Veterinary College in 1992, dean of graduate studies in 1995, associate vice-president (academic) in 1999, and provost and vice-president (academic) in 2000.

As president of the University of Guelph, Summerlee earned $434,517.92 per year, which made him the highest-paid person at the university.  He was the ninth-highest-paid university president in Canada (as of 2011), and second-highest-paid in Ontario (as of 2012).

Summerlee faced controversy for his inadequate response as president of the University of Guelph to a sexual assault in the athletics department. On September 21, 2006, the father of a female student contacted Summerlee, and provided correspondences between Dave Scott-Thomas (his daughter's running coach) and his daughter, as proof of grooming leading to sexual assault. Summerlee did not reply, despite a note that the victim was underage at the time of the abuse.

Notes

References
 Brief Biography – President Alastair J. S. Summerlee

External links
 Office of the President

Living people
Academic staff of the University of Guelph
People from Guelph
Presidents of Carleton University
Presidents of the University of Guelph
Canadian university and college chief executives
Year of birth missing (living people)